Pseudhipposaurus is an extinct genus of biarmosuchian therapsids from the Late Permian of South Africa.

See also

 List of therapsids

References

 The main groups of non-mammalian synapsids at Mikko's Phylogeny Archive

Biarmosuchians
Prehistoric therapsid genera
Permian South Africa
Fossils of South Africa
Fossil taxa described in 1952
Taxa named by Lieuwe Dirk Boonstra